3 is the second acoustic and live extended play by Albanian singer and songwriter Elvana Gjata. It was released on 10 February 2018 through digital download and streaming outlets. The record contains six live and acoustic covers of songs written by Pirro Çako and produced by Darko Dimitrov. It notably includes a poem written by the Albanian Renaissance writer and national poet of Albania, Naim Frashëri. The record incorporates elements of pop folk, pop rock and folk in its production and beats, which marked a significant departure from her previous work. Elvana Gjata published a short documentary film dealing with the journey of the composition of the EP. She additionally held an acoustic performance in Tirana.

Promotion 

For promotional purposes, 3 was accompanied by six music videos for its singles respectively, and were premiered onto the YouTube channel of Elvana Gjata one day after the digital release on 11 February 2018. The aforementioned videos were solely directed by Erion Bubullima and produced by the singer's regular collaborator Dalina Buzi, while Florind Tenolli and Shpëtim Baça were hired as the directors of photography.

Track listing 

Credits adapted from YouTube.

Personnel 

Credits adapted from Tidal.
 
 Elvana Gjata – composition, performing, vocals 
 Pirro Çako – composition, songwriting
 Darko Dimitrov – arrangement

Release history

Charts

References 

 

2018 EPs
2018 live albums
Elvana Gjata albums
Live EPs
Albanian-language albums